Rolf Torstendahl (born 9 January 1936, in Jönköping) is emeritus professor of history at the University of Uppsala where he has spent most of his career. He was Sven Warburg professor of history at the University of Stockholm from 1978 to 1980. Torstendahl has a special interest in bureaucratisation, the professionalism of engineers, and historiography. His book History-Making: The Intellectual and Social Formation of a Discipline (1996) describes the evolution of historical professionalism.

He is a fellow of the Norwegian Academy of Science and Letters.

Selected publications
History-Making: The Intellectual and Social Formation of a Discipline. Uppsala University, Uppsala, 1996. (With I. Veit-Brause) 
State policy and gender system in the two German states and Sweden 1945-1989. Uppsala University, Uppsala, 1999.
"From all-round to professional education: How young historians became members of an academic community in the nineteenth century." Leidschrift, Leiden: Stichting Leidschrift. 25(1): 17–31, 2010.
The Birth of Democratic Culture in Late Imperial Russia: reforms and elections to the first two national legislatures, 1905-1907. Uppsala University, Uppsala, 2012. (With N. Selunskaja) 
The Rise and Propagation of Historical Professionalism. Routledge, 2014. (Routledge Approaches to History)

References 

1936 births
Living people
People from Jönköping
Uppsala University alumni
Academic staff of Uppsala University
Academic staff of Stockholm University
20th-century Swedish historians
Historiographers
Members of the Norwegian Academy of Science and Letters
21st-century Swedish historians